Cheshmeh Kanan railway station (Persian: ايستگاه راه آهن چشمه کنان, Istgah-e Rah Ahan-e Cheshmeh Kanan) is located near the village of Ghelman Saray, East Azerbaijan Province, with the village of Cheshmeh Kanan, the namesake of the station,  to the east of the station. The station is owned by IRI Railway. The station is right on the provincial boundary between East and West Azerbaijan, and serves villages of Chehregan Rural District, west of Sharafkhaneh

References

External links

Railway stations in Iran